Nantay Pty. Ltd., trading as Maroomba Airlines since 1998, is a small airline and air charter company based in Perth, Western Australia.

Overview
Founded in 1985 as Maroomba Aviation, then renamed  Maroomba Air Services in 1997, the airline operates ad hoc charter services around Western Australia.

It currently operates fly-in fly-out mining charter contracts and also operates a Beechcraft Super King Air and a Hawker 850XP business jet on behalf of the Western Australian government for ministerial transport around the state. In November 2008, Maroomba was selected to operate the Rio Tinto LifeFlight jet, on behalf of the Royal Flying Doctor Service, Western Operations. The Hawker 800XP is the first jet aircraft to be used by the RFDS and allows faster transport of patients around the expanses of WA.

Fleet 

As of February 2023 the Maroomba Airlines fleet consists of:

 3 De Havilland Canada Dash 8-100
 2 De Havilland Canada Dash 8-300

References

External links 
 Maroomba Airlines
 

Airlines established in 1985
Australian companies established in 1985
Regional Aviation Association of Australia
Airlines of Western Australia
Companies based in Perth, Western Australia
Charter airlines of Australia